The following are the national records in athletics in Colombia maintained by its national athletics federation: Federación Colombiana de Atletismo (FECODATLE).

Outdoor

Key to tables:

+ = en route to a longer distance

h = hand timing

A = affected by altitude

a = aided road course according to IAAF rule 260.28

Men

Women

Mixed

Indoor

Men

Women

Notes

References
General
Colombian Outdoor Records 31 December 2020 updated
Specific

External links
FECODATLE website

Colombia
Records
Athletics
Athletics